The Balli Kombëtar (literally National Front), known as Balli, was an Albanian nationalist, collaborationist and anti-communist resistance movement during the Second World War. It was led by Ali Këlcyra and by Midhat Frashëri. The movement was formed by members from the landowning elite, liberal nationalists opposed to communism and other sectors of society in Albania. The motto of the Balli Kombëtar was: "" (Albania to the Albanians, Death to the Traitors). Eventually the Balli Kombëtar joined the Nazi established puppet government and fought as an ally against communist guerrilla groups. The Balli Kombëtar engaged in significant acts of terror culminating in atrocities committed against Serb and Greek civilians.

History

Although Këlcyra and Frashëri had initiated opposition actions against the Italian authorities almost from the beginning of the fascist occupation in 1939, they had practically not developed any military organization for open struggle against the invader.  Albanian nationalists from the end of 1942 began an irregular fight against the Italian garrisons.

The Balli Kombëtar was officially founded in November 1942 by joining the efforts of a series of nationalists. It tried to find an agreement with the Albanian partisans of communist affiliation, led by Enver Hoxha and grouped in the "Movement of National Liberation" (LANÇ, for its acronym in Albanian), trying to attract them to the nationalist cause. However, the Balli Kombëtar condemned any cooperation of the LNC with the Yugoslav partisans, whom it considered natural enemies of Albania, which would soon be a deal breaker.

With Italy on the brink of defeat in 1943, the Albanian National Liberation Movement (LANÇ) and the Balli Kombëtar organized a meeting in the village of Mukje. The Balli Kombëtar entered into a fragile alliance with the communist-led LANÇ, and acted as a resistance group against the Italians. Following the Mukje Agreement, the vague mutual tolerance that had existed between the Ballists and LANÇ quickly evaporated. The Allies too could not guarantee that Kosovo would be a part of Albania, because they stood for the restoration of occupied nations under their borders as they existed prior to World War II.

Despite their lukewarm attitude towards the Allies, the Ballists feared that an Allied victory in the war might well result in LANÇ victory and communist control of Albania. Their lukewarm attitude towards the British was also fostered by their desire to preserve the occupied united Albanian state under the borders drawn by the Italians in 1941, for they bitterly opposed and dreaded the loss of Kosovo and Debar to Yugoslavia once again, and feared that the Allies in their support of the Greeks might prevent them from claiming Chameria and deprive them of their southern provinces of Korçe and Gjirokaster, the heartland of their liberation movement. They regarded the Yugoslavs and the Greeks as their real enemies.

The Mukje Agreement immediately triggered a hostile reaction from the Yugoslav representative in Albania, Svetozar Vukmanoviċ. He denounced the agreement and put pressure on the LANÇ to repute it immediately, and Yugoslav Communist leader Milovan Đilas subsequently described the Balli Kombëtar as "Albanian Fascists".

The Balli Kombëtar, which had fought against the Italians, were threatened by the superior forces of the LANÇ and the Yugoslav Partisans, who were backed by the Allies. In the autumn of 1943, Nazi Germany occupied all of Albania after Italy was defeated. Fearing reprisals from larger forces, the Balli Kombëtar made a deal with the Germans and formed a "neutral government" in Tirana which continued its war with the LANÇ and the Yugoslav Partisans.

Albania

Safet Butka, a hardline Albanian nationalist, tried at various times to cooperate with the Communist-dominated Liberation Front (LANÇ). By January 1943, in Southern Albania, some Partisan units fought alongside the Balli Kombëtar during the Battle of Gjorm where they defeated and routed the Italian troops. In February 1943, he organized a meeting with communist-led LANÇ representatives and an agreement for cooperation was reached in March 1943. He also made another local agreement in August 1943 and was one of the initiators and supporters of the Mukje agreement. The communist-led LANÇ had demanded that Kosovo be ceded to Albania after the war. The LANÇ met with the Ballists in August 1943, agreeing upon the establishment of Greater Albania. The agreement was however short-lived. The agreement was the denounced by Albanian communists. In the south of Albania, the rivalry between the Communists and the Balli Kombëtar heated up. The Communists almost immediately repudiated the Mukaj agreement, and fearing the British might open a second front in the Balkans and lend their support to the Ballists, they issued orders that the Balli Kombëtar be eliminated wherever it was found. These factors contributed to members of the Balli Kombëtar forming a strong hatred for the Communists.

After forming the collaborator government, the Ballists pressed hard against the Communists. They destroyed a fairly large Communist partisan group southwest of Tirana. By the Fall of 1943 the Ballists, assisted by German forces, were also involved in vicious fighting against the Northern Epirus Liberation Front in Southern Albania. This Greek Nationalist group was destroyed during these clashes and was eliminated as a fighting force.

With the Grand Alliance established, the Germans began losing the war. This also affected the situation in Albania as the Germans could not supply the Ballists. With the current situation favouring the Communists, the partisans began a full-scale attack on the Balli Kombëtar. British liaison officers in Albania noted that the Communists were using the arms they received to fight fellow Albanians far more than to harass the Germans. The west noted that the Communists could not have won without the supplies and armaments from the British, America and Yugoslavia, and that the LANÇ were not afraid of murdering their own countrymen.

Kosovo and Vardar
 
The Ballists in Kosovo and Vardar region rose to prominence following the capitulation of Italy in September 1943. They seized Struga and Debar from the Italians on 9 September 1943, taking much of the military equipment left behind. Following the establishment of the Albanian Kingdom, leading members of the Balli Kombetar from Kosovo became involved in forming the new government. On 6 November 1943, Berlin announced that the regents and the assembly had formed a government headed by Kosovar Albanian Rexhep Mitrovica, who had joined the Balli Kombëtar resistance movement in 1942 and spent much of the Italian period in prison in Porto Romano near Durrës. Mitrovica's cabinet, most of whom had credentials as nationalists as well as some German or Austrian connection, included Xhafer Deva. Deva, a leading Ballist also from Kosovo, was appointed Minister of the Interior in the Government of Rexhep Mitrovica and collaborated with the Germans to oppose the spread of Communist forces in the north, effectively giving him direct command over the forces of the new government. The fighting in Kosovo took on an ethnic and ideological basis with the Albanian Balli Kombetar forces fighting the predominantly Serb Partisans.

In Vardar Macedonia, when it was a part of the independent state of Albania, the German and Ballist forces had occasional skirmishes with Yugoslav partisans. Kicevo, which remained in the hands of Macedonian and Albanian Partisan units following the capitulation of Italy, was attacked by the Ballists of Xhem Hasa in early November 1943. After 7 days of fierce fighting, the Partisans were defeated and forced to retreat from the city. Fiqri Dine, Xhem Hasa and Hysni Dema, as well as three German Majors, also directed military campaigns against the Albanian and Yugoslav partisans. When Maqellarë, midway between Debar and Peshkopi, was recaptured by the Fifth Partisan Brigade, the Germans with the assistance of the Ballist forces of Xhem Hasa launched an attack from Debar, defeating the partisans. The main centres of the Balli Kombëtar in these regions were Kosovska Mitrovica, Drenica and Tetovo. It was noted that the Balli Kombëtar in these regions were more aggressive than the Ballists of Albania. With the tables now turned in their favour many Ballists saw an opportunity to take their revenge upon their Serbian neighbours for the suffering they had endured over previous two decades, burning perhaps as many as 30,000 houses belonging to Serbs and Montenegrins. Most vulnerable to these attacks were Serbs who had settled in Kosovo in the interwar period.

 
In October 1944, as the German Army began retreating through Kosovo, fierce battles between the Germans and the Partisans broke out. After the Germans had been driven out, Tito ordered the collection of weapons in Kosovo and the arrest of prominent Albanians. The order was not well received and, combined with passions felt about Kosovo, inflamed an insurrection. On 2 December 1944, anti-communist Albanians from the Drenica region attacked the Trepca mining complex and other targets. Numbering at most 2,000 men, these anti-communists managed to hold off a Partisan force of 30,000 troops for two months. Similarly in Kičevo, Gostivar and Tetovo, the remaining Ballists tried to remain in control of the region after the Yugoslav Partisans announced victory. Now "an armed uprising of massive proportions" broke out in Kosovo led by the Balli Kombëtar (which still had around 9,000 men under arms at the time), which aimed to resist incorporation of Kosovo into communist Yugoslavia. It was only in July 1945 that the Yugoslav Partisans were able to put down the uprising and establish their control over Kosovo.

Montenegro and Sandžak region
Parts of Montenegro and the Sandžak were annexed into Albania in 1941. The cities included Bijelo Polje, Tutin, Plav, Gusinje, Rozaje and Ulcinj. Some of the Yugoslav Muslims that lived in these regions sided with the Albanians. Acif Hadziahmetovic, former mayor of Novi Pazar and member of Nexhip Draga's party, and Ballist forces under Shaban Polluzha successfully repelled the combined Chetnik-Yugoslav Partisan forces back from Novi Pazar, and crushed their stronghold in Banja. Novi Pazar remained under the control of Acif Hadziahmetovic who was a member of the nationalist Balli Kombëtar movement, right up until December 1944. During this time the region between Ballist held Novi Pazar and Chetnik controlled Raška, witnessed constant fighting between the Albanians, Yugoslav Muslims and Serbs in the narrow valley that separates the two towns.

Greece
Balli Kombëtar was also active in northwestern Greece, in particular in a region referred to by Albanians as Chameria. Administration of the Thesprotia prefecture was handed over to the Albanians, although this region was not officially annexed into the Albanian kingdom. The "Balli Kombëtar Çam" (Cham National Front), founded in 1943 by Nuri Dino, received full German support since they were willing to fight both Albanian and Greek Communist Partisans. These units were used in anti-partisan operations in Greece codenamed Augustus. By the time Operation Augustus ended, a larger number Chams were recruited for armed support. Their support was appreciated by the Germans: Lt Colonel Josef Remold remarked that "with their knowledge of the surrounding area, they have proved their value in the scouting missions". On several occasions, these scouting missions engaged EDES units in combat. On 27 September (1943), combined German and Cham forces launched large scale operation in villages north of Paramythia: Eleftherochori, Seliani, Semelika, Aghios Nikolaos. In this operation the Cham contingent numbered 150 men, and, according to German Major Stöckert, "performed very well".

Atrocities 
Under the idea of creating a racially pure Greater Albania, the Balli Kombëtar enacted campaigns of terror against Serb civilians in Kosovo and Montenegro.. Following the founding of the Second League of Prizren, the Balli Kombëtar combined with the SS Skanderbeg division massacred thousands of Serbs and expelled between 10,000 and 100,000 Serb colonists from the region. In October 1943 during a large-scale German offensive in southern Albania, the Balli Kombëtar in conjunction with German troops attacked Greek villages and committed numerous atrocities including burning villages and executing civilians.

Revival 
The Balli Kombëtar was revived in Albania as a political party in the early 1990s . Founded under the leadership of Abas Ermenji, a surviving Ballist, who escaped from Albania when the communists declared victory in 1945. In 1996 it won 5 percent of the popular vote and two seats in parliament. It has since declined. In the 2001 elections it was part of the Union for Victory (Bashkimi për Fitoren) coalition which received 37.1% of the vote and 46 members of parliament.

The National Front has chapters in Kosovo, led by Sylejman Daka & in North Macedonia, led by Vebi Xhemaili.

Program
Midhat Frashëri believed that Albanian provinces under the Ottoman Empire were unfairly partitioned during World War I amongst Yugoslavia and Greece. After World War II, Midhat Frashëri began advocating for a Greater Albania. When Midhat Frashëri formed the Balli Kombëtar, it was based on his nationalist ideas and the old ideologies of Abdyl Frashëri, Ymer Prizreni and Isa Boletini. The works of Franz Nopcsa, Johann Georg von Hahn and Milan Šufflay, helped strengthen the nationalists' cause. The Balli Kombëtar believed that Albanians were "Aryans of Illyrian heritage". This helped gaining support by the Nazis. The party had also a strong agrarian socialist wing, which gained the leadership of the party after the war with its leader Abaz Ermenji, and also Zef Pali, Halil Maçi and Vasil Andoni.

The original objectives of Balli Kombëtar were set out in 1942 in the following ten-point program, also known as the "Decalogue"

Aftermath
After World War II ended, the Balli Kombëtar were defeated by Yugoslav and Albanian communists.  The Ballists were so thoroughly discredited by their collaboration with the Nazis that there was no chance of them having a role in postwar Albania, though it took until 1945 to finish them off.  Ironically, the Ballists' decision to work with the Nazis brought about the one thing they had sought to prevent – a Communist-dominated government. Balli Kombëtar fighters fled the Balkans to Austria, the United States, Australia, Switzerland and South America. The Ballists who did not escape were executed. An organization was set up in exile.

Many Ballists that managed to escape Albania subsequently set up the CIA backed Free Albania Committee, aimed at organising the Albanian diaspora to overthrow Enver Hoxha's Communist regime in Albania. Starting in 1949 British and American trained Albanian fighters (consisting of men from Balli Kombëtar and the monarchist movement, known as Legaliteti) were parachuted into Albania with the aim of organizing a popular revolt against Hoxha, marking the start of the Albanian Subversion. The operation failed, thanks in no small part to infamous double agent Kim Philby, who leaked crucial details of the plan to the communist authorities who were consequently able to intercept many of the fighters upon arrival. The subversion cost the lives of at least 300 men and for a long time was one of the most carefully concealed secrets of the Cold War.

In 1950, the Balli Kombëtar (in-exile) was divided into two wings, one Agrarian headed by Abas Ermenji, and one headed by Ali Këlcyra.

Legacy
Tetovo was once the largest Balli Kombëtar base in Albania and still has strong ties with the name. The Tetovo-based football club KF Shkendija has a large support firm called the Ballistët. They are known in the media in North Macedonia for their use of hardline nationalistic rhetorics in football matches. The most notable Ballist leader in Macedonia was Xhem Hasa from Gostivar. A statue of him has been erected in Simnica, just south of Gostivar, by local Albanians.

Prof. Asc. Dr. Enver Bytyci states that the reason for Albanians joining the Axis powers was not for racist and fascist ideology but rather to escape the brutality of the previous decades of Serbian rule.

See also
Albanian Fascist Party
21st Waffen Mountain Division of the SS Skanderbeg (1st Albanian)
Vulnetari
Këshilla
Greater Albania
History of Albania

References

Sources

 
 
 
 
 
 
 
 
 
 
 
 
 
 

 
1942 establishments in Albania
1945 disestablishments in Albania
Organizations established in 1942
Organizations disestablished in 1945
Modern history of Kosovo
Epirus in World War II
Albanian nationalist organizations
Albania in World War II
Paramilitary organizations based in Albania
Parties of one-party systems
Anti-communist organizations in Albania
Italian protectorate of Albania (1939–1943)
Collaboration with Fascist Italy
Collaboration with Nazi Germany